William Lloyd may refer to:

Military
William Lloyd (British Naval officer) (1725–1796), Admiral of the White
William Lloyd (British Army officer) (1778–1815), British soldier of the Napoleonic Wars, wounded at the Battle of Waterloo
William Alvin Lloyd (1822–1868), steamboat and railroad guide publisher, was employed during the Civil War as a personal spy for President Abraham Lincoln
William R. Lloyd (1916–1942), Naval officer
William Lloyd George, 3rd Viscount Tenby (born 1927), British peer and soldier

Politics
William F. Lloyd (1864–1937), newspaper editor and Prime Minister of Newfoundland
William Henry Lloyd (1932–1992), Baltimore attorney, candidate for the U.S House of Representatives
William R. Lloyd, Jr. (born 1947), Pennsylvania politician
William Lloyd (councillor) (born 1988), Brentwood First councillor
J. William Lloyd (1857–1940), American individualist anarchist
William Bross Lloyd (1875–1946), American attorney and political activist
William Field Lloyd (1873–1965), member of the Queensland Legislative Assembly

Religion
William Lloyd (bishop of Worcester) (1627–1717), Bishop of St Asaph, of Lichfield and Coventry and of Worcester
William Lloyd (bishop of Norwich) (1637–1710), Bishop of Llandaff, Peterborough and Norwich
William Lloyd (bishop of Killala and Achonry) (died 1716), Irish Anglican priest
William Lloyd (Methodist minister) (1771–1841), Welsh Anglican priest who became a Methodist preacher

William Lloyd (archdeacon of Durban) (1802–1881), Archdeacon of Durban

Other
Sir William Lloyd (mountaineer) (1782–1857), soldier and mountaineer 
William Forster Lloyd (1794–1852), British economist
William Watkiss Lloyd (1813–1893), writer
William Lloyd (engineer) (1822–1905), British civil engineer
William Alford Lloyd (1826–1880), English zoologist and aquarist
William Lloyd (rugby league) (1934–2011), Australian rugby league player
William Lloyd (rugby union) (born 1990), New Zealand rugby union player
William Patrick Lloyd, sideman for the music band Placebo

See also
Bill Lloyd (disambiguation)